Uruguay competed at the 1984 Summer Olympics in Los Angeles, United States.  The nation returned to the Olympic Games after participating in the American-led boycott of the 1980 Summer Olympics. Eighteen competitors, seventeen men and one woman, took part in eleven events in five sports.

Basketball

Men's Team Competition 
 Preliminary Round (Group B)
 Defeated France (91-87)
 Lost to Spain (90-107)
 Lost to United States (68-104)
 Lost to Canada (80-95)
 Defeated PR China (74-67)
 Quarterfinals
 Lost to Yugoslavia (82-110)
 Classification Matches
 5th/8th place: Defeated Australia (101-95)
 5th/6th place: Lost to Italy (102-111) → Sixth place

 Team Roster
 Víctor Frattini
 Luis Larrosa
 Horacio López
 Juan Mignone
 Hébert Núñez
 Walter Pagani
 Carlos Peinado
 Julio Pereyra
 Luis Pierri
 Wilfredo Ruiz
 Alvaro Tito
 Horacio Perdomo

Boxing

 Honorio Masón

Cycling

One cyclist represented Uruguay in 1984.

 Carlos García 
Men's points race — 32nd
Men's 1 km time trial — NP (→ no ranking)
Men's individual pursuit — Lost in Round 1

Sailing

 Enrique Dupont
 Alejandro Ferreiro
 Bernd Knuppel

Swimming

Men's 200m Freestyle
 Carlos Scanavino
 Heat — 1:52.70
 B-Final — 1:52.54 (→ 13th place)

Men's 400m Freestyle
 Carlos Scanavino
 Heat — 3:55.92
 B-Final — scratched (→ did not advance, 17th place)

Men's 1500m Freestyle 
 Carlos Scanavino
 Heat — 15:29.78 (→ did not advance, 10th place)

Men's 100m Butterfly
 Carlos Scanavino
 Heat — 57.46 (→ did not advance, 31st place)

Women's 200m Individual Medley
 Rosa Silva
 Heat — DSQ (→ did not advance, no ranking)

References

External links
 Montevideo.com
 Official Olympic Reports

Nations at the 1984 Summer Olympics
1984
1984 in Uruguayan sport